India Fashion Awards is an organization that honors fashion designers, models, photographers and every other tier of individual who contributes to the Indian fashion industry. The India Fashion Awards was conceptualized by Talent Factory, founder - Sanjay Nigam, and Co-founder - Raj Sarthak Nigam to provide a platform for the fashion society, to support and honor the earnest professionals for the efforts and hard work, that they contributed in making the Indian fashion industry successful.

The first edition of IFA  was held in February 2020 in Delhi, in association with DLF Avenue.  Politician Maneka Gandhi, businessman Ravi Kant Jaipuria, and designers Leena Singh and Rocky Star participated in the jury of IFA 2020. The winner list  includes: Candice Pinto in the category of Legendary Model; Rohit Bal, as Iconic Designer; Manish Malhotra was recognized as the label of the year and custom design; Gaurav Gupta received the award of Designer of the Year in Popular Choice; Shahnaz Husain received the trophy of the Torch Bearer of the Beauty Industry and the list goes on.

The second edition of IFA 
 was held on 25 September 2021 in order to acknowledge, reward, and promote the efforts shown by the industry members between March 2020 and September 2021. It was hosted by Sunil Grover and Hussain Kuwajerwala and the winner's list  includes the names of Miss Malini, Anamika Khanna, Nitibha Kaul, Raghav Chadha, Siddharth Tytler and so on.

To bring together every individual from the fashion fraternity insignificant of their profession and highlight the best of talents, India Fashion Awards is dedicated to come up with exciting initiatives like Fashion Entrepreneur Fund, Show Director's Night, Seven States, and many more.

Awarded Categories

Artisan Felicitation 
The category recognizes the hidden efforts of karigars and artisans in an individual niche art, who have kept the art of Indian heritage alive through their craftsmanship and artistry through the years and rewards them for their years of dedicated hard work.

Emerging Model of the year 
The category recognizes the accomplishments of models who have mounted to work under grand reputable brands over a set period of time. Rising to establish their own names in a limited amount of time is truly reward-worthy.

Emerging Fashion Designer of the Year 
The category recognizes the upcoming fashion designers on how they emerged to gain fame with their astonishing campaigns that got appreciated over a limited period of time.

Leader of Sustainability 
The category recognizes the efforts of individuals and brands who contribute to the sustainable development of the fashion industry and revolutionize fashion whilst supporting the environment.

Fashion Designer of the Year 
The category recognizes the creativity of fashion designers who brought their innovative idea to life with their extraordinary campaigns. The category further expands in jury choice,  popular choice, international fame, and many more.

Fashion Trendsetter of the Year 
The category recognizes the creative ideas of an individual that started a fashion trend over a course of time that inspired millions who couldn't resist to groove in their footsteps.

Show Director of the Year 
The category recognizes the efforts of professionals behind the invisible curtains that make fashion shows so glamorous. The Show Directors who give life to the fashion campaigns of designers is truly reward-worthy.

Face of the Year 
The category recognizes the originality of models who left an imprint in digital and print media. It rewards the models who work apart from runways in the commercial field and makes the campaign popular with their face value.

Fashion Influencer of the Year 
The category recognizes the influence that an individual holds over a million people through their prevalent platform. It appreciates the creativity that they acquire to stay relevant and inspire others.

Fashion Stylist of the Year 
The category recognizes the creativity of stylists, whether working with individuals, designers or brands, on how they carried out the beautiful intimations of their ideas that is appreciated by the audience.

Fashion Photographer of the Year 
The category recognizes the tireless hours and efforts of the professional photographers in the fashion industry that they require to get the perfect shots.

Makeup Artist of the Year 
The category recognizes the innovative makeup looks from photoshoots to theatres, through cosmetics to prosthetics done by the professional makeup artists and bring something new and beautiful to the table.

Backstage Manager of the Year 
The category recognizes the hard work of backstage managers of the fashion shows, and the dedication of persistence they put in to their work that makes the campaign run smoothly.

Past Award Winners

India Fashion Awards 2020 
{| class="wikitable" style="font-size:90%; text-align:left"
      'Name of the Winner'
    'Award Category'
  
      Ritu Beri 
    Fashion Designer of the Year : International Fame
  
      Shahnaz Husain
    Torch Bearer of Beauty Industry
  
      Masoom Minawala
    Fashion Influencer of the Year
  
      Rahul Jhangiani
    Fashion Photographer of the Year 
  
      Prabh Uppal
    Emerging Model of the Year
  
      Aishwarya Sushmita
    Emerging Face of the Year
  
      Robin Raina
     Fashionable Emerging Entrepreneur 
  
      Vahbiz Mehta 
     Emerging Show Director of the Year 
  
      Dayana Erappa 
    Face of the Year 
  
       Gaurav Raina
     Music Director of the Year 
  
       Ambika Pillai 
     Makeup Artist of the Year
  
       Gautam Kalra
    Fashion Stylist of the Year 
  
      Rohit Bal
    Iconic Fashion Designer of the Country: Jury Choice 
  
   
</table>
and many more...

India Fashion Awards 2021 
{| class="wikitable" style="font-size:90%; text-align:left"
      'Name of the Winner'
    'Award Category'
  
      Miss Malini
    Female Digital Entrepreneur of the Year
  
      Ramneek Pantal
    Legendary super model
  
      Vaishali S
    Designer of the year – International Fame
  
      Delnaz
    Backstage Manager of the year
  
      Taras Taraporvala
    Fashion Photographer of the year
  
      Anamika Khanna 
    Designer of the Year : Jury Choice
  
       Tarun Khiwal
     Legendary Photographer of the Country
  
       Amit Aggarwal 
     Digital Fashion Film of the Year 
  
      Sahil Kochhar 
     Innovative Designer in Craft Techniques
  
       Namrata Soni
    Makeup Artist of the Year 
  
      Aparna Anisha
    Show Director of the year 
  
      Conrad Sangma 
     Leader of Sustainability 
  
      Inega 
    Talent Management of the Year 
  
</table>

and many more..

References 

Indian fashion
Fashion events in India
Fashion awards